Brooke Miller may refer to:
 Brooke Miller (cyclist), American road racing cyclist
 Brooke Miller (soccer) (born 1998), Australian soccer player
 Brooke Miller (musician) (born 1982), Canadian singer-songwriter
 Brooke Miller (born 1988), contestant on America's Next Top Model, Cycle 7